Institut National de Recherches en Sante Publique is a national research institute in Nouakchott, Mauritania. It is located on the Avenue Gamal Abdel Nasser, opposite the Grand National Hospital of Mauritania and just east of the Ministry of Energy headquarters.

References

Universities in Mauritania
Nouakchott